In a controversy over the foundations of mathematics, in twentieth-century mathematics, L. E. J. Brouwer, a proponent of the constructivist school of intuitionism, opposed David Hilbert, a proponent of formalism. The debate concerned fundamental questions about the consistency of axioms and the role of semantics and syntax in mathematics. Much of the controversy took place while both were involved with the prestigious Mathematische Annalen journal, with Hilbert as editor-in-chief and Brouwer as a member of its editorial board. In 1920 Hilbert succeeded in having Brouwer, whom he considered a threat to mathematics, removed from the editorial board of Mathematische Annalen, the leading mathematical journal of the time.

Background 
The background for the controversy was set with David Hilbert's axiomatization of geometry in the late 1890s. In his biography of Kurt Gödel, John W. Dawson, Jr summarizes the result as follows: "At issue in the sometimes bitter disputes was the relation of mathematics to logic, as well as fundamental questions of methodology, such as how quantifiers were to be construed, to what extent, if at all, nonconstructive methods were justified, and whether there were important connections to be made between syntactic and semantic notions."

Dawson observes that "partisans of three principal philosophical positions took part in the debate" – the logicists (Gottlob Frege and Bertrand Russell), the formalists (David Hilbert and his "school" of collaborators), and the constructivists (Henri Poincaré and Hermann Weyl); within this constructivist school was the radical self-named "intuitionist" L.E.J. Brouwer.

Brief history of Brouwer and intuitionism 
Brouwer in effect founded the mathematical philosophy of intuitionism as a challenge to the then-prevailing formalism of David Hilbert and his collaborators Paul Bernays, Wilhelm Ackermann, John von Neumann and others. As a variety of constructive mathematics, intuitionism is essentially a philosophy of the foundations of mathematics. It is sometimes and rather simplistically characterized by saying that its adherents refuse to use the law of excluded middle in mathematical reasoning.

In 1908: "... Brouwer, in a paper entitled 'The untrustworthiness of the principles of logic', challenged the belief that the rules of the classical logic, which have come down to us essentially from Aristotle (384–322 B.C.) have an absolute validity, independent of the subject matter to which they are applied".

"After completing his dissertation (1907: see Van Dalen), Brouwer made a conscious decision temporarily to keep his contentious ideas under wraps and to concentrate on demonstrating his mathematical prowess" (Davis (2000), p. 95); by 1910 he had published a number of important papers, in particular the fixed-point theorem. Hilbert the formalist with whom the intuitionist Brouwer would ultimately spend years in conflict admired the young man and helped him receive a regular academic appointment (1912) at the University of Amsterdam. It was then that "Brouwer felt free to return to his revolutionary project which he was now calling intuitionism".

In the later 1920s, Brouwer became involved in a public and demeaning controversy with Hilbert over editorial policy at Mathematische Annalen, at that time a leading learned journal. He became relatively isolated; the development of intuitionism at its source was taken up by his student Arend Heyting.

Origins of disagreement
The nature of Hilbert's proof of the Hilbert basis theorem (dating from 1888) turned out to be more controversial than Hilbert could have imagined at the time. Although Kronecker had conceded, Hilbert would later respond to others' similar criticisms that "many different constructions are subsumed under one fundamental idea" — in other words (to quote Reid): "Through a proof of existence, Hilbert had been able to obtain a construction"; "the proof" (i.e. the symbols on the page) was "the object".

Not all were convinced. While Kronecker would die soon after, his constructivist banner would be carried forward by sharp criticism from Poincaré, and later in full cry by the young Brouwer and his developing intuitionist "school"—Weyl in particular, much to Hilbert's torment in his later years (Reid 1996, pp. 148–149).  Indeed, Hilbert lost his "gifted pupil" Weyl to intuitionism: "Hilbert was disturbed by his former student's fascination with the ideas of Brouwer, which aroused in Hilbert the memory of Kronecker."

Brouwer the intuitionist in particular objected to the use of the Law of Excluded Middle over infinite sets (as Hilbert had indeed used it). Hilbert would respond: "'Taking the Principle of the Excluded Middle from the mathematician ... is the same as ... prohibiting the boxer the use of his fists.' "The possible loss did not seem to bother Weyl."

Validity of the law of excluded middle
In the same paper the text of an address delivered in 1927 Hilbert clearly expresses himself. At first he attempts to defend his axiomatic system as having "important general philosophical significance". For him, the statement of "definite rules" expresses "the technique of our thinking". Nothing is hidden, no tacit assumptions are admitted: "after all, it is part of the task of science to liberate us from arbitrariness, sentiment and habit, and to protect us from the subjectivism that ... finds its culmination in intuitionism".

But then Hilbert gets to the nub of it the proscription of the law of excluded middle (LoEM): "Intuitionism's sharpest and most passionate challenge is the one it flings at the validity of the principle of excluded middle ..."

To doubt the LoEM when extended over the completed infinite was to doubt Hilbert's axiomatic system, in particular his "logical ε-axiom". To take away the LoEM was to destroy the "science of mathematics". Finally, Hilbert singles out one man by implication, not by name for the cause of his present tribulation: "I am astonished that a mathematician should doubt that the principle of excluded middle is strictly valid as a mode of inference. I am even more astonished that, as it seems, a whole community of mathematicians who do the same has so constituted itself. I am most astonished by the fact that even in mathematical circles the power of suggestion of a single man, however full of temperament and inventiveness, is capable of having the most improbable and eccentric effects."

Brouwer answers pique with pique: "formalism has received nothing but benefactions from intuitionism and may expect further benefactions. The formalistic school should therefore accord some recognition to intuitionism, instead of polemicizing against it in sneering tones, while not even observing proper mention of authorship."

Deeper philosophic differences

A philosophical defeat in the quest for "truth" in the choice of axioms 

However "truth" is ultimately defined, for a few mathematicians Hilbert's formalism seemed to eschew the notion. And at least with respect to his choice of axioms the case can be made that indeed he does eschew the notion. The fundamental issue is just how does one choose "the axioms"? Until Hilbert proposed his formalism, the axioms were chosen on an "intuitive" (experiential) basis. Aristotelian logic is a good example – based on one's life-experiences it just seems "logical" that an object of discourse either has a stated property (e.g. "This truck is yellow") or it does not have that property ("This truck is not yellow") but not both simultaneously (the Aristotelian Law of Non-Contradiction). The primitive form of the induction axiom is another – if a predicate P(n) is true for n = 0 and if for all natural numbers n, if P(n) being true implies that P(n+1) is true, then P(n) is true for all natural numbers n.

Hilbert's axiomatic system – his formalism – is different. At the outset it declares its axioms. But he doesn't require the selection of these axioms to be based upon either "common sense", a priori knowledge (intuitively derived understanding or awareness, innate knowledge seen as "truth without requiring any proof from experience" ), or observational experience (empirical data). Rather, the mathematician in the same manner as the theoretical physicist is free to adopt any (arbitrary, abstract) collection of axioms that they so choose. Indeed, Weyl asserts that Hilbert had "formaliz[ed] it [classical mathematics], thus transforming it in principle from a system of intuitive results into a game with formulas that proceeds according to fixed rules". So, Weyl asks, what might guide the choice of these rules? "What impels us to take as a basis precisely the particular axiom system developed by Hilbert?". Weyl offers up "consistency is indeed a necessary but not sufficient condition" but he cannot answer more completely except to note that Hilbert's "construction" is "arbitrary and bold". Finally he notes, in italics, that the philosophical result of Hilbert's "construction" will be the following: "If Hilbert's view prevails over intuitionism, as appears to be the case, then I see in this a decisive defeat of the philosophical attitude of pure phenomenology, which thus proves to be insufficient for the understanding of creative science even in the area of cognition that is most primal and most readily open to evidence – mathematics."

In other words: the role of innate feelings and tendencies (intuition) and observational experience (empiricism) in the choice of axioms will be removed except in the global sense – the "construction" had better work when put to the test: "only the theoretical system as a whole ... can be confronted with experience".

The law of excluded middle extended to the infinite 
Cantor (1897) extended the intuitive notion of "the infinite" – one foot placed after the other in a never-ending march toward the horizon – to the notion of "a completed infinite" – the arrival "all the way, way out there" in one fell swoop, and he symbolized this notion with a single sign ℵ0 (aleph-null). Hilbert's adoption of the notion wholesale was "thoughtless", Brouwer believed. Brouwer in his (1927a) "Intuitionistic reflections on formalism" states: "SECOND INSIGHT The rejection of the thoughtless use of the logical principle of the excluded middle, as well as the recognition, first, of the fact that the investigation of the question why the principle mentioned is justified and to what extent it is valid constitutes an essential object of research in the foundations of mathematics, and, second, of the fact that in intuitive (contentual) mathematics this principle is valid only for finite systems. THIRD INSIGHT. The identification of the principle of excluded middle with the principle of the solvability of every mathematical problem".

This Third Insight is referring to Hilbert's second problem and Hilbert's ongoing attempt to axiomatize all of arithmetic, and with this system, to discover a "consistency proof" for all of mathematics – see more below. So into this fray (started by Poincaré) Brouwer plunged head-long, with Weyl as back-up.

Their first complaint (Brouwer's Second Insight, above) arose from Hilbert's extension of Aristotle's "Law of Excluded Middle" (and "double negation") – hitherto restricted to finite domains of Aristotelian discourse – to infinite domains of discourse". In the late 1890s Hilbert successfully axiomatized geometry. Then he went on to successfully (or so Hilbert thought) use the Cantorian-inspired notion of the completed infinity to produce elegant, radically abbreviated proofs in analysis (1896 and afterwards). In his own words of defense Hilbert believed himself quite justified in what he had done (in the following he calls this type of proof an existence proof): "...I stated a general theorem (1896) on algebraic forms that is a pure existence statement and by its very nature cannot be transformed into a statement involving constructibility. Purely by use of this existence theorem I avoided the lengthy and unclear argumentation of Weierstrass and the highly complicated calculations of Dedekind, and in addition, I believe, only my proof uncovers the inner reason for the validity of the assertions adumbrated by Gauss and formulated by Weierstrass and Dedekind." "The value of pure existence proofs consists precisely in that the individual construction is eliminated by them and that many different constructions are subsumed under one fundamental idea, so that only what is essential to the proof stands out clearly; brevity and economy of thought are the raison d'être of existence proofs."

What Hilbert had to give up was "constructibility" – his proofs would not produce "objects" (except for the proofs themselves – i.e. symbol strings), but rather they would produce contradictions of the premises and have to proceed by reductio ad absurdum extended over the infinite.

Hilbert's quest for a generalized proof of consistency of the axioms of arithmetic 
Brouwer viewed this loss of constructibility as bad, but worse when applied to a generalized "proof of consistency" for all of mathematics.  In his 1900 address Hilbert had specified, as the second of his 23 problems for the twentieth century, the quest for a generalized proof of (procedure for determining) the consistency of the axioms of arithmetic.  Hilbert, unlike Brouwer, believed that the formalized notion of mathematical induction could be applied in the search for the generalized consistency proof.

A consequence of this marvelous proof/procedure P would be the following: Given any arbitrary mathematical theorem T (formula, procedure, proof) put to P (thus P(T)) including P itself (thus P(P)), P would determine conclusively whether or not the theorem T (and P) was provable – i.e. derivable from its premises, the axioms of arithmetic. Thus for all T, T would be provable by P or not provable by P and under all conditions (i.e. for any assignment of numerical values to T's variables). This is a perfect illustration of the use of the Law of Excluded Middle extended over the infinite, in fact extended twice – first over all theorems (formulas, procedures, proofs) and secondly for a given theorem, for all assignment of its variables. This point, missed by Hilbert, was first pointed out to him by Poincaré and later by Weyl in his 1927 comments on Hilbert's lecture: "For after all Hilbert, too, is not merely concerned with, say 0' or 0' ', but with any 0' ... ', with an arbitrarily concretely given numeral. One may here stress the "concretely given"; on the other hand, it is just as essential that the contentual arguments in proof theory be carried out in hypothetical generality, on any proof, on any numeral. ... It seems to me that Hilbert's proof theory shows Poincaré to have been completely right on this point."

In his discussion preceding Weyl's 1927 comments van Heijenoort explains that Hilbert insisted that he had addressed the issue of "whether a formula, taken as an axiom, leads to a contradiction, the question is whether a proof that leads to a contradiction can be presented to me".
 "But [writes van Heijenoort] in a consistency proof the argument does not deal with one single specific formula; it has to be extended to all formulas. This is the point that Weyl has in mind ... ."

If successful the quest would result in a remarkable outcome: Given such a generalized proof, all mathematics could be replaced by an automaton consisting of two parts: (i) a formula-generator to create formulas one after the other, followed by (ii) the generalized consistency proof, which would yield "Yes – valid (i.e. provable)" or "No – not valid (not provable)" for each formula submitted to it (and every possible assignment of numbers to its variables). In other words: mathematics would cease as a creative enterprise and become a machine.

The problem of the law of excluded middle with respect to induction 
In van Heijenoort's commentary preceding Weyl's (1927) "Comments on Hilbert's second lecture on the foundations of mathematics" Poincaré points out to Hilbert (1905) that there are two types of "induction" (1) the intuitive animal-logic foot-following-foot version that gives us a sense that there's always another footstep after the last footstep, and (2) the formal version – e.g. Peano's version: a string of symbols. The gang of three – Poincaré, Weyl and Brouwer – claimed that Hilbert tacitly, and unjustifiably, adopted as one of his premises formal induction (the Kleensymbol string). Poincaré (1905) asserted that, by doing this, Hilbert's reasoning became circular. Weyl's (1927) agreement and Brouwer's polemics ultimately forced Hilbert and his disciples Herbrand, Bernays and Ackermann to reexamine their notion of "induction" – to eschew the assumption of a "totality of all the objects x of an infinite collection" and (intuitionistically) assume that the general argument proceeds one x after another, ad infinitum (van Heijenoort p. 481, footnote a). This is in fact the so-called "induction schema" used in the notion of "recursion" that was still in development at this time (van Heijenoort p. 493) – this schema was acceptable to the intuitionists because it had been derived from "the intuition".

To carry this distinction further, Kleene 1952/1977 distinguishes between three types of mathematical induction – (1) the formal induction rule (Peano's axiom, see the next section for an example), (2) the inductive definition (examples: counting, "proof by induction"), and (3) the definition by induction (recursive definition of "number-theoretic functions or predicates). With regards to (3), Kleene considers primitive recursive functions:

Echoes of the controversy 
Brouwer's insistence on "constructibility" in the search for a "consistency proof for arithmetic" resulted in sensitivity to the issue as reflected by the work of Finsler and Gödel. Ultimately Gödel would "numeralize" his formulae; Gödel then used primitive recursion (and its instantiation of the intuitive, constructive form of induction – i.e. counting and step-by-step evaluation) rather than a string of symbols that represent formal induction. Gödel was so sensitive to this issue that he took great pains in his 1931 to point out that his Theorem VI (the so-called "First incompleteness theorem") "is constructive;45a, that is, the following has been proved in an intuitionistically unobjectionable manner ... ." He then demonstrates what he believes to be the constructive nature of his "generalization formula" 17 Gen r. Footnote 45a reinforces his point.

Gödel's 1931 does include the formalist's symbol-version of the Peano Induction Axiom; it looks like this, where "." is the logical AND, f is the successor-sign, x2 is a function, x1 is a variable, x1Π designates "for all values of variable x1":
 (x2(0).x1Π(x2(x1)⊃x2(fx1))⊃x1Π(x2(x1))
But he does not appear to use this in the formalist's sense.

Note that there is contention around this point. Gödel specifies this symbol string in his I.3., i.e. the formalized inductive axiom appears as shown above – yet even this string can be "numeralized" using Gödel's method. On the other hand, he doesn't appear to use this axiom. Rather, his recursion steps through integers assigned to variable k (cf his (2) on page 602). His skeleton-proof of Theorem V, however, "use(s) induction on the degree of φ", and uses "the induction hypothesis". Without a full proof of this, we are left to assume that his use of the "induction hypothesis" is the intuitive version, not the symbolic axiom. His recursion simply steps up the degree of the functions, an intuitive act, ad infinitum. But Nagel and Newman note that Gödel's proofs are infinitary in nature, not finitary as Hilbert requested (see Hilbert's second problem) while Gödel insisted that they are intuitionistically satisfactory. These are not incompatible truths, as long as the LoEM over the infinite isn't invoked anywhere in the proofs.

Despite the last-half-twentieth century's continued abstraction of mathematics, the issue has not entirely gone away. Here are two examples. First, the premises of an argument – even ones considered beyond questioning – are always fair game. A hard look at the premises of Turing's 1936–1937 work led Robin Gandy (1980) to propose his "principles for mechanisms" that throw in the speed of light as a constraint. Secondly, Breger (2000) in his "Tacit Knowledge and Mathematical Progress" delves deeply into the matter of "semantics versus syntax" – in his paper Hilbert, Poincaré, Frege, and Weyl duly make their appearances. He examines a core problem: in axiomatic proofs the tacit assumption of an experienced, thinking mind: to be successful it must come to the argument equipped with prior knowledge of the symbols and their use (the semantics behind the mindless syntax): "Mathematics as a purely formal system of symbols without a human being possessing the know-how for dealing with the symbols is impossible [according to the chemist Polanyi (1969, 195), the ideal of a form of knowledge that is strictly explicit is contradictory because without tacit knowledge all formulas, words, and illustrations would become meaningless]" (brackets in the original, Breger 2000:229).

Kleene on Brouwer–Hilbert

A serious study of this foundational controversy can be found in Stephen Kleene's Introduction to Metamathematics, particularly in Chapter III: A critique of mathematical reasoning. He discusses §11. The paradoxes, §12. First inferences from the paradoxes [impredicative definitions, Logicism etc.], §13. Intuitionism, §14. Formalism, §15. Formalization of a theory.  Kleene takes the debate seriously, and throughout his book he actually builds the two "formal systems", e.g. on page 119 he shows those logical laws such as double negation that are disallowed in the intuitionist system.

Notes

Bibliography 
 W.S. Anglin 1994, Mathematics: A Concise History and Philosophy, Springer-Verlag, New York. .
 Herbert Breger, 2000. "Tacit Knowledge and Mathematical Progress", appearing in E. Groshoz and H. Breger (eds.) 2000, The Growth of Mathematical Knowledge, Kluwer Academic Publishers, Dordrecht Netherlands, pages 221–230.
 Martin Davis, 1965. The Undecidable: Basic Papers on Undecidable Propositions, Unsolvable Problems, and Computable Functions, Raven Press, New York, no ISBN. This includes:
 Emil Post, 1936. "Finite Combinatory Process. Formulation I", with commentary (pages 288ff)
 Emil Post, 1941 unpublished until 1965. "Absolutely Unsolvable Problems and Relatively Undecidable Propositions: Account of an Anticipation", with commentary, (pages 338ff)
 On the battle for editorial control of the journal Mathematische Annalen between Hilbert and Brouwer, stemming in part from their foundational differences. The title of this work is a reference to Batrachomyomachia, a classical parody of the Iliad.
Martin Davis, 2000. The Engines of Logic, W. W. Norton, London,  pbk. Cf. Chapter Five: "Hilbert to the Rescue" wherein Davis discusses Brouwer and his relationship with Hilbert and Weyl with brief biographical information of Brouwer.
John W. Dawson, Jr, 1997. Logical Dilemmas: The Life and Work of Kurt Gödel, A. K. Peters, Wellesley, MA, .
Robin Gandy, 1980. "Church's Thesis and Principles for Mechanisms", appearing in J. Barwise, H. J. Keisler and K. Kunen, eds., 1980, The Kleene Symposium, North-Holland Publishing Company, pages 123–148.
Stephen Hawking, 2005.  God Created the Integers: The Mathematical Breakthroughs that Changed History: edited, with commentary, by Stephen Hawking, Running Press, Philadelphia, . Hawking's commentary on, and an excerpt from Cantor's "Contributions to the Founding of the Theory of Transfinite Numbers" appears on pp. 971ff.
David Hilbert (1927), "The foundations of mathematics" appearing at http://www.marxists.org/reference/subject/philosophy/works/ge/hilbert.htm and apparently derived from Sohotra Sarkar (ed.) 1996, The Emergence of Logical Empiricism: From 1900 to the Vienna Circle, Garland Publishing Inc, [no publisher's location, no ISBN]. Hilbert's famous address wherein he presents and discusses in some depth his formalism axioms, with particular attention paid to double negation and the Law of Excluded Middle (LoEM) and his "e-axiom. [This on-line document contains typographical errors; a better version is van Heijenoort's Hilbert (1927).]
Stephen Kleene, 1952 with corrections 1971, 10th reprint 1991, Introduction to Metamathematics, North-Holland Publishing Company, Amsterdam Netherlands, . Cf. in particular Chapter III: A Critique of Mathematical Reasoning, §13 "Intuitionism" and §14 "Formalism".
Jean van Heijenoort, 1976 (2nd printing with corrections), From Frege to Gödel: A Source Book in Mathematical Logic, 1879–1931, Harvard University Press, Cambridge Massachusetts,  (pbk.). The following papers and commentary are pertinent and offer a brief time-line of publication. (Important further addenda of Gödel's regarding his acceptance of Turing's machines as a formal logical system to replace his system (Peano Axioms + recursion) appear in Martin Davis, The Undecidable):
Hilbert (1904). On the foundations of logic and arithmetic, p. 129
Brouwer (1923, 1954, 1954a). On the significance of the principle of excluded middle in mathematics, especially in function theory, p. 334
Brouwer (1927) . On the domains of definition of functions p. 446
Hilbert (1927). The foundations of mathematics p. 464. (Hilbert's famous address).
Weyl (1927). Comments on Hilbert's second lecture on the foundations of mathematics p. 480.
Bernays (1927). Appendix to Hilbert's lecture "The foundations of mathematics" p. 485
Brouwer (1927a). Intuitionistic reflections on formalism p. 490
Gödel (1930a, 1931, 1931a). Some metamathematical results on completeness and consistency. On formally undecidable propositions of Principia mathematica and related systems I, and on compleness and consistency p. 592
Brouwer (1954, 1954a). Addenda and corrigenda, and Further addenda and corrigenda, p. 334ff
Ernest Nagel and James Newmann 1958, Gödel's Proof, New York University Press, no ISBN, Library of Congress card catalog number 58-5610.
Constance Reid 1996. Hilbert, Springer, . The biography in English.
Bertrand Russell, originally published 1912, with commentary by John Perry 1997. The Problems of Philosophy, Oxford University Press, New York, .

History of mathematics
Constructivism (mathematics)
Scientific controversies
Intuitionism